Sfar may refer to:

Joann Sfar (born 1971), French comics artist, comic book creator and film director
Rachid Sfar (born 1933), Tunisian Prime Minister under Habib Bourguiba 
Selima Sfar (born 1977), Tunisian tennis player
Sfäär, a restaurant in Tallinn, Estonia